Bezirk Oberpullendorf is a district of the state of 
Burgenland in Austria.

Municipalities
Towns (Städte) are indicated in boldface; market towns (Marktgemeinden) in italics; suburbs, hamlets and other subdivisions of a municipality are indicated in small characters.
Where appropriate, the Hungarian or Croatian names are given in parentheses.
 Deutschkreutz (3,126)
 Girm
 Draßmarkt (1,376)
 Karl, Oberrabnitz
 Frankenau-Unterpullendorf (Frakanava-Dolnja Pulja) (1,179)
 Frankenau, Großmutschen, Kleinmutschen, Unterpullendorf
 Großwarasdorf (Veliki Borištof) (1,452)
 Kleinwarasdorf, Langental, Nebersdorf
 Horitschon (1,881)
 Unterpetersdorf
 Kaisersdorf (Kalištrof) (610)
 Kobersdorf (1,928)
 Lindgraben, Oberpetersdorf
 Lackenbach (1,112)
 Lackendorf (570)
 Lockenhaus (2,011)
 Glashütten bei Langeck im Burgenland, Hammerteich, Hochstraß, Langeck im Burgenland
 Lutzmannsburg (885)
 Strebersdorf
 Mannersdorf an der Rabnitz (1,804)
 Klostermarienberg, Liebing, Rattersdorf, Unterloisdorf
 Markt Sankt Martin (1,175)
 Landsee, Neudorf bei Landsee
 Neckenmarkt (1,695)
 Haschendorf
 Neutal (1,055)
 Nikitsch (Filež) (1,424)
 Kroatisch Geresdorf (Gerištof), Kroatisch Minihof (Mjenovo)
 Oberloisdorf (780)
 Oberpullendorf (3,029)
 Mitterpullendorf
 Pilgersdorf (1,661)
 Bubendorf im Burgenland, Deutsch Gerisdorf, Kogl im Burgenland, Lebenbrunn, Salmannsdorf im Burgenland, Steinbach im Burgenland
 Piringsdorf (863) 
 Raiding (815)
 Ritzing (916) 
 Steinberg-Dörfl (1,259) 
 Dörfl, Steinberg
 Stoob (1,466) 
 Unterfrauenhaid (665) 
 Unterrabnitz-Schwendgraben (650)
 Schwendgraben, Unterrabnitz
 Weingraben (Bajngrob) (362)
 Weppersdorf (1,838)
 Kalkgruben, Tschurndorf

 
Districts of Burgenland